WPRS may refer to:

Radio
 WPRS-FM, a radio station (104.1 FM) licensed to serve Waldorf, Maryland, United States
 WIBU, a radio station (1440 AM) licensed to serve Paris, Illinois, United States, which held the call sign WPRS until 2017
 WPRS-FM, former call sign (1952–1974; 98.3 FM) for radio station WWVR (FM), licensed to Paris, Illinois, United States

Other
 Waterloo Regional Police Service (WPRS), in the Regional Municipality of Waterloo, Ontario, Canada
 West Palaearctic Regional Section (WPRS), part of the International Organization for Biological Control
 Welsh Paranormal Research Society (WPRS), the society that conducts research into claims of unexplained, supernatural phenomena, based in Wales, UK

See also
 WPR (disambiguation)